Poeta quadrinotata is a moth of the family Notodontidae first described by Francis Walker in 1865. It is found in Sri Lanka, Peninsular Malaysia, Sumatra and Borneo.

Its body is blackish brown with white fasciations. Fasciation is not punctate and consists of white edging on each side of fine, irregular, dark fasciae. The margin of the forewing has a central black spot.

References

External links
On Some Lepidoptera from the Riouw-Archipelago

Moths of Asia
Moths described in 1865
Tinoliinae